The Şükrü Saracoğlu Stadium (Known for sponsorship reasons as Ülker Stadyumu Fenerbahçe Şükrü Saracoğlu Spor Kompleksi, or Ülker Stadium for short) is a football stadium located in the Kadıköy district of Istanbul, Turkey. It is the traditional home venue of major Turkish multi-sport club Fenerbahçe SK. The stadium was inaugurated in 1908 and renovated between 1929 and 1932, 1965 and 1982, and 1999 and 2006. On 4 October 2006, after numerous inspections by UEFA, Ülker Stadium was selected to host the 2009 UEFA Cup Final that went down to history as the last Final of the UEFA Cup football tournament, which was rebranded as the UEFA Europa League starting from the 2009–10 season.

History
Before the Ülker Stadyumu was built, the field was known as Papazın Çayırı (The field of the priest). The field, however, became the very first official association football pitch of Turkey, where the first league games of the Istanbul Football League were all held consecutively. In 1908, the local teams in the league needed a regular football field, so this land was leased from the Ottoman Sultan Abdul Hamid II for 30 Ottoman gold pounds a year. The total construction cost was 3,000 Ottoman gold pounds. The name was changed to the Union Club Field after the club which made the highest donation for construction of the ground.

The Union Club Field was used by many teams in İstanbul, including the owner, Union Club (which changed its name to İttihatspor after World War I), Fenerbahçe, Galatasaray, and Beşiktaş. However, it lost its importance when a bigger venue, the Taksim Stadium, was built in 1922, inside the courtyard of the historic Taksim Topçu Kışlası (Taksim Artillery Barracks), which was located at the present-day Taksim Gezi Parkı (Taksim Park).

İttihatspor (which had close relations with the political İttihat ve Terakki), was forced to sell it to the state, in which Şükrü Saracoğlu (1887–1953) was a member of the CHP government. Thus, the ownership of the stadium passed to the state, but the field was immediately leased to Fenerbahçe. Later, on May 27, 1933, Fenerbahçe purchased the stadium from the government when Şükrü Saracoğlu was the President of Fenerbahçe, for either the symbolic amount of 1 TL or the worth of the stadium which was 9,000 TL.

The name of the field was changed to Fenerbahçe Stadium, and this made Fenerbahçe SK the first football club in Turkey to own their stadium, with the help of the Şükrü Saracoğlu government. In the following years, Fenerbahçe SK renovated the stadium and increased its seating capacity. By the year 1949, Fenerbahçe Stadium was the largest football venue in Turkey, with a seating capacity of 25,000.

The name of the stadium was changed once more in 1998, becoming Fenerbahçe Şükrü Saracoğlu Stadium, named after Fenerbahçe's legendary chairman and Turkey's fifth prime minister Şükrü Saracoğlu. In 1999, the latest round of renovations and capacity increasing projects started. The stands on the four sides of the stadium were torn down one at a time, as the Turkish Super League seasons progressed, and the entire renewal and construction project was finalised in 2006. As of 2015, Ülker secured naming rights of the stadium in a 10-year deal worth $90 million officially renaming the stadium Ülker Stadium Fenerbahçe Şükrü Saracoğlu Sports Complex.

References

External links 

Fenerbahçe Ülker Stadium
Fenerbahçe Ülker Stadium Official Website
Fenerbahçe Ülker Stadium's interior view from all seats
Fenerbahçe Ülker Stadium
Venue Information
Atmosphere at Ülker

Sports venues in Istanbul
Fenerbahçe S.K.
Fenerbahçe S.K. (football)
Sports venues completed in 1908
Sport in Kadıköy
Süper Lig venues
1908 establishments in the Ottoman Empire